Phil Suarez is an American entrepreneur and restaurateur, from Manhattan, New York. He was born in Washington Heights, New York City, where he attended George Washington High school. He is the youngest of four, and the son of Puerto Rican immigrants.

Advertising career
Suarez began working part-time for Papert Koenig & Lois, in the television production department ran by ad man George Lois. It was there he gained experience in media production, which led him in the direction of forming his own company.

Suarez left Papert Koenig & Lois to form a joint venture with Bob Giraldi, known as Giraldi Suarez Productions in 1973. The two met playing at an ad agency basketball game.

Giraldi Suarez Productions went on to produce award winning ad campaigns for Miller Brewing, and numerous music videos for artists including Lionel Richie, Pat Benatar, Diana Ross, Paul McCartney, as well as Michael Jackson's “Beat It” video. The company also produced theatrical trailers for Broadway plays like Evita, Dream Girls, A Chorus Line. Suarez produced & Giraldi Directed the feature film “Dinner Rush” starring Danny Aiello. Giraldi Suarez Productions has won over 300 major advertising awards.

Restaurant career

Suarez saw an opportunity to extend his production life into the restaurant business saying “It was like going from one theatre to another. I loved that I could translate the art of production into another realm equally as thrilling to me as music and television”.

In 1980 he opened Positano, a restaurant inspired by the cuisine of the Amalfi coast. Positano paved the way for Suarez’s relationship with now internationally renowned chef Jean-Georges Vongerichten. In 1991 the two opened JoJo, a contemporary French atelier that earned accolades including three stars from The New York Times and Restaurant of the Year from Esquire Magazine.

Suarez’s next creation was Patria. A restaurant that brought the then-unfamiliar flavors of Latin America into a fine dining context. Patria was a launching pad for Suarez whose projects have come to attain national and international success.

Since 1991 Suarez has opened:

Restaurants 

Suarez and Jean-Georges Vongerichten have continued to work together for over twenty years creating international restaurants.

Phil Suarez has been nominated by the James Beard Foundation as Outstanding Restaurateur for 2011, 2012, and 2013.

Other ventures

Suarez and his wife Lucy are two of the producers of the musical Kinky Boots, which opened April 2013, in New York City. The musical was nominated for 13 Tony Awards, It has been awarded 6 Tony's, including Best Musical.

Suarez is a partner in the West Perry development company, in which architect Richard Meier developed the 'sister' buildings on the corners of Perry and West streets. These buildings have been the residences of many celebrities.

He has actively served on the board of directors of the Police Athletic League for more than twenty years. He has also been on the board of the New York Urban Coalition, acted as President of the Catholic Big Brothers Association, and is a member of the New York State Commission on Human Rights.

References

American restaurateurs
American venture capitalists
George Washington Educational Campus alumni
Living people
Year of birth missing (living people)